Jean-Loup Philippe (born 24 March 1936) is a French actor, writer and director of film and theatre He is best known for his role in Jean Rollin's 1975 horror classic Lèvres de sang. He had collaborated will Rollin on several occasions, having worked on Les paumées du petit matin (1981), Killing Car (1993) and La nuit des horloges (2007).

Career
Philippe began his acting career in 1956, appearing uncredited in the film En effeuillant la marguerite, with Daniel Gélin and Brigitte Bardot.  He had a larger role in his next film, Escapade, with Louis Jourdan.  Following his 1957 film, Une manche et la belle, his acting career became somewhat erratic, with film appearances occurring every few years. After a long break, Philippe returned with the film, L'itinéraire marin in a small role, and his first time working with French director Jean Rollin.  He starred in the 1963 film Les bonnes causes, with award-winning actors Marina Vlady, Bourvil, and Virna Lisi.  His final film of the sixties was the comedy Les gros bras.  Following another long break, Philippe starred in Jean Rollin's Lèvres de sang, his first leading role, and a film he is best known for, for which he also served as dialogue writer.  His final three films were also direct by Rollin, Les paumées du petit matin, Killing Car and La nuit des horloges.  Philippe's other credits include the adult feature, Le sexe qui parle and Un jour un tueur, with the award-winning actress Mylène Demongeot.

Philippe has also appeared on television, his first appearance was in the 1964 television film Mademoiselle Molière.  He guest starred in the long-running television comedy series Au théâtre ce soir and the mini-series Cinq à sec.

In 2011, Philippe appeared in the Jean Rollin documentary Jean Rollin, le rêveur égaré.

Filmography

Theatre
 1956: Thé et sympathie (Tea and Sympathy) (Tom), directed by Jean Mercure - Théâtre de Paris
 1959: Spectacle, directed by Jacques Polieri - Théâtre de l'Alliance
 1960: Le centre (The Centre), directed by Jacques Polieri - Théâtre de l'Alliance
 1960: À vous Wellington (Wellington to You), directed by François Maistre - Théâtre du Vieux-Colombier
 1966: Les portes claquent (The Doors Slam) (Georges)

References

External links
 

1936 births
Living people
Male actors from Paris
French male stage actors
French male film actors
French male television actors
Writers from Paris
French male writers